Grupo Aymara  are a Bolivian folk troupe that have been acclaimed worldwide for its inspiring interpretations of traditional music of pre-Hispanic and contemporary music of the Andes, particularly that of the Aymara and Quechua speaking people of Bolivia. They perform their evocative music on indigenous flutes, panpipes and drums, as well as stringed instruments introduced since the Spanish conquest.

Discography
Concierto en los Andes de Bolivia (1974)
Imantata (1977)
Bolivia tradicional (1978)
Villancicos (1979)
Cultura andina (1980)
Jacha marca (1980)
Concierto - Canto a Bolivia (1982)
Grupo Aymara (1982)
Aliriña (1991)
Lo mejor (1993)
Soul of Aymara (1995)
Viento en los Andes (1995)
Live in Japan (1995)
Treasures of indio music, vol III (1998)

External links
Clarken Orosco Official Site

Bolivian musical groups